Barontoli is a village in Tuscany, central Italy, in the comune of Sovicille, province of Siena.

Barontoli is about 10 km from Siena and 8 km from Sovicille.

Bibliography
 

Frazioni of Sovicille